Orville "Ike" W. Hagen (September 26, 1915 – June 24, 2007) was a North Dakota Republican Party politician who served as the 27th Lieutenant Governor of North Dakota under Governor William Guy, and as the state's first North Dakota Commissioner of Labor from 1966 to 1986 when he lost his bid for re-election to Byron Knutson. He tried to run on the Republican Party ticket for Governor of North Dakota in 1980, but was defeated in the primary by Allen I. Olson.

Hagen was born on the family farm outside of Watford City, North Dakota. He was the son of Oscar W. Hagen  (1884-1945) and Carrie (Scollard) Hagen (1886- 1961). He attended Dickinson State College. In 1939, he married Astrid Berg.  Early in his career, he worked on his father's weeklynewspaper, the McKenzie Counter Leader  and later the Watford (ND) Guide. He worked for the Williston (ND) Herald until 1946.  
He died at the age of 91 and was buried at Schafer Cemetery McKenzie County, North Dakota.

References

1915 births
2007 deaths
Lieutenant Governors of North Dakota
North Dakota Labor Commissioners
People from McKenzie County, North Dakota
North Dakota Republicans
20th-century American politicians
American Lutherans
20th-century Lutherans